Igor Dmitriyevich Pestretsov (born 9 January 1963) is a former Russian professional footballer.

See also
Football in Russia

References

External links

1963 births
Sportspeople from Krasnodar
Living people
Soviet footballers
Russian footballers
FC Kuban Krasnodar players
FC Rubin Kazan players
FC Dynamo Moscow reserves players
FC Dynamo Bryansk players
FC Lokomotiv Moscow players
Navbahor Namangan players
Piteå IF (men) players
IK Brage players
Association football goalkeepers
Russian expatriate footballers
Expatriate footballers in Sweden
Russian expatriate sportspeople in Sweden